Walter Burley Griffin (November 24, 1876February 11, 1937) was an American architect and landscape architect. He is known for designing Canberra, Australia's capital city, and the New South Wales towns of Griffith and Leeton.

Influenced by the Chicago-based Prairie School, Griffin developed a unique modern style. He worked in partnership with his wife Marion Mahony Griffin. In 28 years they designed over 350 buildings, landscape and urban-design projects as well as designing construction materials, interiors, furniture and other household items.

Early life
Griffin was born in 1876 in Maywood, Illinois, a suburb of Chicago. He was the eldest of the four children of George Walter Griffin, an insurance agent, and Estelle Burley Griffin. His family moved to Oak Park and later to Elmhurst. As a boy, he had an interest in landscape design and gardening, and his parents allowed him to landscape the yard at their new home in Elmhurst. Griffin attended Oak Park High School. He considered studying landscape design but was advised by the landscape gardener O. C. Simonds to pursue a more lucrative profession.

Griffin chose to study architecture, and, in 1899, completed his bachelor's degree in architecture at the University of Illinois at Urbana-Champaign. The University of Illinois program was run by Nathan Clifford Ricker, a German-educated architect, who emphasized the technical aspects of architecture. During his studies, he also took courses in horticulture and forestry.

Chicago career

After his studies, Griffin moved to Chicago and was employed as a draftsman for two years in the offices of progressive architects Dwight H. Perkins, Robert C. Spencer, Jr., and H. Webster Tomlinson in "Steinway Hall". Griffin's employers worked in the distinctive Prairie School style. This style is marked by horizontal lines, flat roofs with broad overhanging eaves, solid construction, craftsmanship, and strict discipline in the use of ornament. Louis Sullivan was influential among Prairie School architects and Griffin was an admirer of his work, and of his philosophy of architecture which stressed that design should be free of historical precedent. Other architects of that school include George Grant Elmslie, George Washington Maher, William Gray Purcell, William Drummond and most importantly, Frank Lloyd Wright.

In July 1901, Griffin passed the new Illinois architects' licensing examination and this permitted him to enter private practice as an architect. He began working in Frank Lloyd Wright's famous Oak Park, Illinois, studios. Although he was never made a partner, Griffin oversaw the construction on many of Wright's noted houses including the Willits House in 1902 and the Larkin Administration Building built in 1904. From 1905 he also began to supply landscape plans for Wright's buildings. Wright allowed Griffin and his other staff to undertake small commissions of their own. The William Emery house, built in Elmhurst, Illinois, in 1903 was such a commission. While working for Wright, Griffin fell in love with Mr. Wright's sister, Maginel Wright. He proposed marriage to her, but his affections for her were not returned, and she refused.

In 1906, he resigned his position at Wright's studio and established his own practice at Steinway Hall. Griffin and Wright had fallen out over events following Mr. Wright's trip to Japan in 1905. While Wright was away for five months, Griffin ran the practice. When Wright returned, he told Griffin that he had overstepped his responsibilities, completing several of Wright's jobs, and sometimes substituting his own building designs. Further, Wright had borrowed money from Griffin to pay for his travels abroad, and then he tried to pay off his debts to Griffin with prints he had acquired in Japan. It became clear to Griffin then that Wright would not make Griffin a partner in his business.
 
Griffin's first independent commission was a landscape design for the State Normal School at Charleston, Illinois, now known as the Eastern Illinois University. In the fall of 1906, he received his first residential job from Harry Peters. The Peters' House was the first house designed with an L-shaped or open floor plan. The L-shape was an economical design and easily constructed. From 1907 to 1914, several houses designed by Griffin were built on the far southwest side of Chicago in the city's Beverly and Morgan Park, Chicago neighborhoods. In 1981, the city of Chicago granted landmark status to 13 of these Prairie-style bungalows in Beverly along the 1700 block of West 104th Place, 12 blocks of Longwood Drive between West 98th and 110th Streets, and three blocks of Seeley Avenue. With seven of these houses being located on West 104th Place—comprising the largest concentration of original prairie style homes built in Chicago—the street as it runs between Hale Avenue on the west to Prospect Avenue on the east was designated the Griffin Place Historic District, which comprises a part of the larger Ridge Historic District.

In 1911, Griffin developed 'Solid Rock' house for William F. Tempel in Winnetka, Illinois. It was the first house built by Griffin in his mature style and of reinforced concrete.

On June 29, 1911, Griffin married Marion Lucy Mahony, a graduate of the Massachusetts Institute of Technology in architecture. She was employed first in Wright's office, and then by Hermann V. von Holst, who had taken over Wright's work in America when Wright left for Europe in 1909. Marion Mahony recommended to von Holst that he hire Griffin to develop a landscape plan for the area surrounding the three houses on Millikin Place for which Wright had been hired in Decatur, Illinois. Mahony and Griffin worked closely on the Decatur project immediately before their marriage.

After their marriage, Mahony went to work in Griffin's practice. A housing development with several homes designed by Griffin and Mahony, Rock Crest – Rock Glen in Mason City, Iowa, is seen as their most dramatic American design development of the decade and remains the largest collection of Prairie Style homes surrounding a natural setting.

From 1899 to 1914, Griffin created more than 130 designs in his Chicago office for buildings, urban plans and landscapes; half of these were built in the mid-western states of Illinois, Iowa, Michigan and Wisconsin.

The relationship between Griffin and Frank Lloyd Wright cooled in the years following Griffin's departure from Wright's firm in 1906. With Walter and Marion's wedding, Wright started to feel they were "against him". After the Griffins' win in the Australian federal capital design competition, and resultant front-page coverage in The New York Times, Wright and Griffin never spoke to each other again. In later years, whenever Griffin was brought up in conversation Wright would downplay his achievements and refer to him as a draftsman.

Canberra

In April 1911, the Australian Commonwealth Government held an international competition to produce a design for its new, as yet unnamed, federal capital city. Griffin produced a design with impressive renderings of the plan by his new wife. They first heard about the competition in July, while on honeymoon, and worked feverishly to prepare the plans. On May 23, 1912, Griffin's design was selected as the winner from among 137 entries. This created significant press coverage at the time and brought him professional and public recognition. Of his plan, he famously remarked:

I have planned a city that is not like any other in the world. I have planned it not in a way that I expected any government authorities in the world would accept. I have planned an ideal city – a city that meets my ideal of the city of the future.

In 1913, Griffin was invited by the Commonwealth Government to Australia to inspect the site, now named Canberra. He left Mahony Griffin in charge of the practice and travelled to Australia in July. His letters reveal his appreciation for the Australian landscape. The Griffins joined the Naturalists' Society of New South Wales in 1914, where they enjoyed organised bush walks and field studies. The society facilitated their contact with the Australian scientific community, especially botanists. This appreciation for Australian flora was reflected in Griffin's 1914 town plan for the town of Leeton in the Murrumbidgee Irrigation Area of New South Wales, and later in a design for Newman College at the University of Melbourne. He also utilised Australian flora botanical names as places names for suburbs and streets in Canberra, such as Grevillea Park, Telopea Park, Clienthus Circle and Blandfordia.

Griffin was offered the position of head of the department of architecture at the University of Illinois. At the same time he was negotiating a three-year contract with the Commonwealth Government to remain in Australia and oversee the implementation of his plan, which he felt had already been compromised. In October 1913, he was appointed the Federal Capital Director of Design and Construction. In this role, Griffin oversaw the design of North and South Canberra, though he struggled with considerable political and bureaucratic obstacles. In May 1914, he and his wife left America for Australia along with architects Roy Lippincott and George Elgh.

With the outbreak of World War I in 1914, Griffin was under pressure to reduce the scope and scale of his plans due to the government diverting funds towards the war effort. Several parts of his basic design underwent change. Plans to create Westbourne, Southbourne and Eastbourne Avenues to complement Canberra's Northbourne Avenue were eliminated, as did a proposed railway connecting South Canberra to North Canberra, and on to Yass, 35 mi (55 km) away. A market area that would have been at Russell Hill in North Canberra was moved south to what is now Fyshwick, next to South Canberra.

The pace of building was slower than expected, partly because of a lack of funds and partly because of continued disputation between Griffin and Commonwealth Government bureaucrats. Many of Griffin's design ideas were attacked by both the architectural profession and the press. In 1917, a Royal Commission determined that they had undermined Griffin's authority by supplying him with false data which he had used to carry out his work. Ultimately, Griffin resigned from the Canberra design project in December 1920 when he discovered that several of these bureaucrats had been appointed to an agency that would oversee Canberra's construction. The Commonwealth Government under the leadership of Prime Minister Hughes had removed Griffin as Director of Design and Construction after disagreements over his supervisory role, and in 1921 it created the Federal Capital Advisory Committee, with John Sulman as chair. Griffin was offered membership, but declined and withdrew from further activity in Canberra.

Griffin designed several buildings for Canberra, none of which was built. The grave of General Bridges on Mount Pleasant was the only permanent structure designed by him to be built in Canberra.

Aside from the city's design, Griffin's longest-living legacy is the plantation of Redwood trees (Sequoia sempervirens and Sequoiadendron giganteum), now known as Pialligo Redwood Forest, that he and arborist Thomas Charles Weston planted in 1918. It is on Pialligo Avenue between Canberra and Queanbeyan, 1.8 mi (2.8 km) east of Canberra airport.

Later career

The Griffins' office in Chicago closed in 1917; however, they had successful practices in Melbourne and Sydney, which were a strong motivation for their continuing to live in Australia. The Griffins had received commissions for work outside Canberra since Walter first arrived in the country in 1913, designing town plans, subdivisions, and one of his highly regarded buildings, Newman College, the Catholic residential college of the University of Melbourne while employed in Canberra. While supervising activities in Canberra, Griffin spent much time in Melbourne and, in 1918, became a founder, with Royden Powell, of the Henry George Club, an organisation devoted to providing a home for the Single Tax movement. The Griffins' first major commission after leaving Canberra was the Capitol Theatre in Melbourne; it opened on November 7, 1924. In 1964 architectural writer Robin Boyd described the Capitol as "the best cinema that was ever built or is ever likely to be built".

In 1916 and 1917, Griffin developed a patented modular concrete construction system known as "Knitlock" for use in the construction of Canberra. No Knitlock buildings were ever built in Canberra, although several were built in Australia. The first were built on Griffin's property in Frankston in 1922, where he constructed two holiday houses called "Gumnuts". The best examples of Knitlock include the S.R. Salter House in Toorak and the Paling House. Frank Lloyd Wright designed a similar system and used Griffin's design to support the arguments for his design.

In 1919, the Griffins founded the Greater Sydney Development Association (GSDA), and in 1921 purchased 259 ha of land in North Sydney. The GSDA's goal was the development of an idyllic community with a consistent architectural feel and bushland setting. Walter Burley Griffin as managing director of the GSDA designed all the buildings built in the area until 1935. Castlecrag was the first suburb to be developed by the GSDA. The Redding House and several others in Castelcrag were also built in Knitlock. Almost all the houses Griffin designed in Castlecrag were small and had flat roofs, and he included an internal courtyard in many of them. Griffin used what was at that time the novel concept of including native bushland in these designs. He came to be referred to as "The Wizard of Castlecrag".

Other work the Griffins did during this time included the Melbourne subdivisions of Glenard (where the Griffins built their own Knitlock house "Pholiota") and Mount Eagle at Eaglemont, and the Ranelagh Estate in Mount Eliza Victoria 1924. The Ranelagh Estate was listed on the Victorian State Heritage Register (H01605) in 2005 as a significant example of a country estate. Prior to 1920 the Griffins also designed the New South Wales towns of Leeton and Griffith. Griffin and architect J Burcham Clamp designed a large tomb built at Waverley Cemetery, Sydney, between 1914 and 1916 for James Stuart, which still stands as a good example of Griffin's sense of 'human-scale monumentality'.

The Griffins participated in the celebrated Chicago Tribune Tower Competition in 1922. Having won one international competition, as architects who were both well acquainted with Chicago and recognized as practical visionaries, they offered a solution that was positive, forward-looking and elegant. Indeed, their entry appears to have been about a decade ahead of its time, with emphatic verticality along the lines of the Art Deco or Art Moderne. It anticipated, and would have been a near neighbor of, Chicago's 333 North Michigan by Holabird & Roche (1928); with stylistic echos in John and Donald Parkinson's Bullocks Wilshire, in Los Angeles (1929), as well as Adah Robinson and Bruce Goff's Boston Avenue Methodist Church, Tulsa (1929).

In the 1920s, the Griffins prepared plans for the Milleara Estate (also known as City View) at Avondale Heights and the Ranelagh Estate at Mount Eliza, both in Victoria (Australia) in conjunction with surveyors Tuxen and Miller.

Incinerators

During the financial hardship of the Great Depression, in the 1930s Griffin designed incinerators, collaborating with the Reverberatory Incinerator and Engineering Company (RIECo), in conjunction with his friend and business partner, Eric Nicholls. He was responsible for twelve incinerator designs between 1930 and 1938, of which seven still survive. They are located at:

 Willoughby, New South Wales
 Glebe, New South Wales
 Ipswich, Queensland
 Essendon, Victoria
 Hindmarsh, South Australia
 Thebarton, South Australia
 Canberra, Australian Capital Territory

The Willoughby incinerator is a good example of this work. It has been listed by the National Trust of Australia and the Royal Australian Institute of Architects as a building of significance. In 1999 it was listed in the New South Wales State Heritage Register. It has since been restored and converted to commercial use by Willoughby Council.

The Walter Burley Griffin Incinerator, Ipswich, Queensland is listed on the Queensland Heritage Register and has been converted into a theatre. Another incinerator was built in the suburb of Pyrmont, not far from the centre of Sydney. This incinerator was considered for heritage listing but was demolished in 1992 because it was in irredeemably bad condition.

India
During their time at the GSDA, the Griffins became more involved in anthroposophy, and in 1935 through contacts in the movement Griffin won a commission to design the library at the University of Lucknow in Lucknow, India.

Although he had planned to stay in India only to complete the drawings for the library, he soon received more than 40 commissions, including the University of Lucknow Student Union building; a museum and library for the Raja of Mahmudabad; a zenana (women's quarters) for the Raja of Jahangirabad; Pioneer Press building, a bank, municipal offices, many private houses, and a memorial to King George V. He also won complete design responsibility for the 1936–1937 United Provinces Exhibition of Industry and Agriculture. His 53 projects for the  site featured a stadium, arena, mosque, imambara, art gallery, restaurant, bazaar, pavilions, rotundas, arcades, and towers, however, only part of his elaborate plans were fully executed.

Griffin was inspired by the architecture and culture of India, modifying forms as "he sought to create a modern Indian architecture ... Griffin was able to expand his aesthetic vocabulary to create an exuberant, expressive architecture reflecting both the 'stamp of the place' and the 'spirit of the times'". While in India, Griffin also published numerous articles for the Pioneer, writing about architecture, in particular about ventilation design improvements. Marion joined Walter in Lucknow in April 1936 to collaborate on several projects.

Death and burial in India
Griffin died of peritonitis in early 1937, five days after gall bladder surgery at King George's Hospital, Lucknow in Lucknow city in state of Uttar Pradesh, India, and was buried in Christian Cemetery in Lucknow. Marion Mahony Griffin oversaw the completion of the Pioneer Building that he had been working on at the time of his death. She closed down their Indian offices, then left their Australian practice in the hands of Griffin's partner, Eric Milton Nicholls, and returned to Chicago.

Legacy

Griffin was largely under-appreciated during his time in Australia, but since his death recognition of his work has steadily grown. In 1964, when Canberra's central lake was filled, as Griffin had intended, Prime Minister Robert Menzies declined to have the lake named after himself. Instead he named it Lake Burley Griffin, making it the first "monument" in Canberra dedicated to the city's designer ("Burley" was included in the name because of the misconception, which has continued, that it was part of Griffin's surname). A road is named after Walter Burley Griffin is a 276 km long road Burley Griffin Way linking between Griffith, Temora and the Hume highway at the west of Bowning 10 km northwest of Yass.

Architectural drawings and other archival materials by and about the Griffins are held by numerous institutions in the United States, including the Drawings and Archives Department of Avery Architectural and Fine Arts Library at Columbia University; the Block Gallery at Northwestern University; the Ryerson & Burnham Libraries at the Art Institute of Chicago; and the New York Historical Society, as well as in several repositories in Australia, including the National Library of Australia, National Archives of Australia, and the Newman College Archives of the University of Melbourne. At the centenary of the Griffins' design work for Canberra, some believe they are owed a permanent memorial.

In his own words 
"I am what may be termed a naturalist in architecture. I do not believe in any school of architecture. I believe in architecture that is the logical outgrowth of the environment in which the building in mind is to be located"
From The New York Times, Sunday June 2, 1912

Major works

India
 Library in University of Lucknow, in Lucknow city in the state of Uttar Pradesh in India
 Dr Bhatia's Residence, still extant in Lucknow city in the state of Uttar Pradesh in India

United States
 G.B. Cooley House, 1908 South Grand St., Monroe, Louisiana
 Alfred W. Hebert House Remodeling, 1902, Evanston, Illinois
 W.H. Emery House, 1903, Elmhurst, Illinois
 Adolph Mueller House, 1906
 John Dickinson House (part of the Eden Rift Estate Winery), 10034 Cienega Road Hollister, California 1906
 Mary H. Bovee Apartment, 1907
 John Gauler House, 5917-5921 N. Magnolia Ave., Chicago, Illinois, 1908
 William S. Orth House, 1908, Winnetka, Illinois
 Edmund C. Garrity House, 1909
 Ralph Griffin House, 1909, Edwardsville, Illinois
 Edmund C. Garrity House, 1712 W. 104th Place, Chicago, Illinois, 1909
 William B. Sloan House, 1910
 Frank N. Olmstead House, 1624 W. 100th Place, Chicago, Illinois, 1910 
 Harry N. Tolles House, 10561 S. Longwood Drive, Chicago, Illinois, 1911
 Harry G. Van Nostrand House, 1666 W. 104th Place, Chicago, Illinois, 1911 
 Russell L. Blount House I, 1724 W. 104th Place, Chicago, Illinois, 1911
 Benjamin J. and Mabel T. Ricker House, 1510 Broad Street, Grinnell, Iowa, 1911-1912
 Joshua Melson House, 1912, Mason City, Iowa
 Russel L. Blount House II, 1950 W. 102nd Street, Chicago, Illinois, 1912–1913
 Jenkinson House, 1727 W. 104th Place, Chicago, Illinois, 1912–1913
 Walter D. Salmon House, 1736 W. 104th Place, Chicago, Illinois, 1912–1913
 Newland House, 1737 W. 104th Place, Chicago, Illinois, 1913
 Ida E. Williams House, W. 104th Place, Chicago, Illinois (based on the Von Nostrand plans, built by Blount), 1913
 William R. Hornbaker House, 1710 W. 104th Place, Chicago, Illinois, (based on the Von Nostrand plans, built by Blount), 1914
 James Frederic Clarke House, 1731 W. 104th Place, Chicago, Illinois, (based on the Von Nostrand plans, built by Blount), 1913
 Harry C. Furneaux House, 1741 W. 104th Place, Chicago, Illinois, (based on the Salmon House plans, built by Blount), 1913
 James Blyth House, Mason City, Iowa
 Stinson Memorial Library, Anna, Illinois

Australia
 Canberra plan, 1914–1920
 Leeton town plan, 1914
 Griffith town plan, 1914
 Eaglemont town plan, 1915
Paris Theatre, Sydney, 1915 (demolished 1981)
 Newman College, University of Melbourne, 1916–1918
 Café Australia, Melbourne, 1916
Pholiota, in Eaglemont, Victoria 1920
 Capitol Theatre, Melbourne 1924
Palais de danse, St Kilda 1925 (destroyed by fire)
 Leonard House, Elizabeth Street Melbourne 1925 (demolished)
 Ranelagh, town plan, 1924
 Langi Flats, Toorak 1925-26
 Castlecrag, suburb plan, 1925
 Fishwick House, completed in 1929
 Lake Daylesford, completed 1929
 Castle Cove, suburb plan, 1930
 Willoughby Incinerator, completed 1932
 Duncan House (Castlecrag), completed 1934
 Eric Pratten House, in Pymble, Sydney, completed 1936
 Hindmarsh Incinerator, South Australia, completed 1936
 Pyrmont Incinerator, completed 1936 (demolished 1992)
 Thebarton Incinerator, South Australia, completed 1937
 Walter Burley Griffin Incinerator, Ipswich, completed 1992

Gallery

References

Citations

Works cited

General references
 Birrell, James. 1964. Walter Burley Griffin. University of Queensland Press
 Gebhard, David & Gerald Mansheim, Buildings of Iowa, Oxford University Press, New York, 1993
 Gebhard, David. "The Suburban House and the Automobile." The Car and the city: The Automobile, the Built Environment and Daily Urban Life. Ann Arbor: University of Michigan Press, 1991: 106,123.
 Kruty, Paul. 2000. Griffin, Walter Burley. American National Biography Online. Oxford University Press
 
 Mason City Iowa, An Architectural Heritage, Department of Community Development, City of Mason, Iowa, 1977
 Maldre, Mati and Paul Kruty, Walter Burley Griffin in America, University of Illinois Press, Urbana, 1996
 McGregor, Alasdair, 'Grand Obsessions: The life and work of Walter Burley Griffin and Marion Mahony Griffin, Penguin/Lantern, Camberwell, Victoria, 2009
 Walker, M., Kabos, A. and Weirick, J. (1994) Building for nature : Walter Burley Griffin and Castlecrag, Castlecrag, N.S.W. : Walter Burley Griffin Society
 Wilson, Richard Guy and Sidney K. Robinson, The Prairie School in Iowa, Iowa State University Press, Ames, 1977

Further reading
 Brooks, H. Allen, Frank Lloyd Wright and the Prairie School, Braziller (in association with the Cooper-Hewitt Museum), New York 1984; 
 Brooks, H. Allen, The Prairie School, W.W. Norton, New York 2006;  
 Brooks, H. Allen (editor), Prairie School Architecture: Studies from "The Western Architect", University of Toronto Press, Toronto, Buffalo 1975;  
 Brooks, H. Allen, The Prairie School: Frank Lloyd Wright and his Midwest Contemporaries, University of Toronto Press, Toronto 1972;  
 Griffin, Dustin (editor), The Writings of Walter Burley Griffin, Cambridge University Press, Melbourne 2008; 
 
 
 McGregor, Alasdair, 'Grand Obsessions: The life and work of Walter Burley Griffin and Marion Mahony Griffin', Penguin/Lantern, Camberwell, Victoria, 2009 
 Turnbull, J. and Navaretti, P. (eds), The Griffins in Australia and India: the complete works of Walter Burley Griffin and Marion Mahony Griffin, Miegunyah Press, Melbourne 1998;

External links

 Walter Burley Griffin Society (Australia)
 Walter Burley Griffin and Marion Mahony Griffin architectural drawings, circa 1909-1937.Held by the Department of Drawings & Archives, Avery Architectural & Fine Arts Library, Columbia University.
 The Griffin Legacy, National Capital Authority
 Imagining Canberra in Chicago from the ABC
 Reading the past in the Walter Burley Griffin Incinerator and Fishwick House at Willoughby, NSW (educational resources)
 Castlecrag Progress Association
 [CC-By-SA] 
 Great Buildings Online: works of Walter Burley Griffin (includes links to W.H. Emery House, 1903; Ralph Griffin House, 1909; Adolph Mueller House, 1906; Joshua Melson House, 1912; and Stinson Memorial Library, 1913)
 Walter Burley Giffiin, The Prairie School of Architecture
 Stinson Memorial Public Library (includes history of Stinson Library construction)
 The Walter Burley Griffin Society of America
 Mary Mahoney Griffin's Manuscript, The Magic of America: Ryerson & Burnham Libraries: Archives Collection
 

National Library of Australia:
 Eric Milton Nicholls collection
 Papers of Walter Burley Griffin and Marion Mahony collected by Eric Nicholls, 1900–1947
 The Donald Leslie Johnson collection of Walter and Marion Griffin documents, 1901–1988
 The work of Walter Burley Griffin and Marion Mahony Griffin in Melbourne, 1975 a collection of photographs by Wolfgang Sievers of works by Walter Burley Griffin and Marion Mahony Griffin taken in 1975

Online exhibitions
 Walter Burley Griffin: in his own right, Public Broadcasting Service
 An Ideal City? The 1912 Competition to Design Canberra an online exhibition developed by the National Archives of Australia, National Library of Australia and the National Capital Authority

 
1876 births
1937 deaths
People from Maywood, Illinois
American landscape architects
American urban planners
Anthroposophists
University of Illinois School of Architecture alumni
Architects from Chicago
Deaths from peritonitis
Artists from Oak Park, Illinois
People from Elmhurst, Illinois
Georgists
American expatriates in Australia
American expatriates in India
History of the Australian Capital Territory